Annie Morris (born 1978) is a British artist based in London.

Morris’ work draws inspiration from her own life experience, using painting, drawing and sculpture. She is best known for pieces that combine obsessive drawing and ready-made sculptures.

Life and career 
She attended Central Saint Martin's and studied at the École nationale supérieure des Beaux-Arts, Paris, under the tutelage of sculptor Giuseppe Penone, then The Slade School of Fine Art, graduating from Camberwell College of Arts. She works from a studio in Stoke Newington she shares with her husband, the British artist Idris Khan.

Morris’ 'Stack’ sculptures shaped from plaster, sand, and painted with raw pigment, resemble a three-dimensional artist’s palette, originally inspired by the 1988 painting- Bed with Colour by Catalan artist Antoni Tàpies. The dry, freshly painted feel of the stack’s form, is Morris’ metaphor to childbirth and fragility. She is also known for her drawings and collaborated with Sophie Dahl's first book The Man with the Dancing Eyes, 2003, published by Bloomsbury.

In 2006 Morris was commissioned by Christopher Bailey, director of fashion label Burberry, to make a dress made out of her painted clothes pegs. Morris was commissioned by American architect Peter Marino to create a work for Louis Vuitton’s flagship store opened in October 2017 at Place Vendôme, Paris.

She is an excellent self-taught chef, specialising in penne al arrabbiata.

Selected exhibitions 
Morris has shown work internationally, including those at:
Timothy Taylor, New York, NY, USA, 2019
The Royal Academy, London, Summer Exhibition, 2012
Baku MoMA, Azerbaijan, Merging Bridges, 2012
The New Art Gallery Walsall, England, The House of Fairytales
Tate Gallery, St. Ives, The House of Fairytales
The Fine Art Society, What Marcel Duchamp Taught Me

References

External links 
Artist's official website
Annie Morris at ProjectB Gallery, Milan
Annie Morris at Winston Wachter, New York.
Annie Morris at Winston Wachter, Seattle.
Annie Morris at Louisa Guinness Gallery, London.

1978 births
Living people
21st-century British sculptors
21st-century English women artists
Alumni of Camberwell College of Arts
English contemporary artists
English feminists
English women sculptors
Sculptors from London